The England national rugby union team represents England in men's international rugby union. They compete in the annual Six Nations Championship with France, Ireland, Italy, Scotland and Wales. England have won the championship on 29 occasions (as well as sharing 10 victories), winning the Grand Slam 13 times and the Triple Crown 26 times, making them the most successful outright winners in the tournament's history. They are currently the only team from the Northern Hemisphere to win the Rugby World Cup, having won the tournament in 2003, and have been runners-up on three other occasions.

The history of the team extends back to 1871 when the English rugby team played their first official test match, losing 1–0 to Scotland. England dominated the early Home Nations Championship (now the Six Nations) which started in 1883. Following the schism of rugby football in 1895 into union and league, England did not win the Championship again until 1910. They first played against New Zealand in 1905, South Africa in 1906, and Australia in 1909. England was one of the teams invited to take part in the inaugural Rugby World Cup in 1987 and progressed to the final in the second tournament in 1991, losing 12–6 to Australia. Following their Grand Slam in 2003, England went on to win the 2003 Rugby World Cup, defeating Australia 20–17 in extra time. They contested the final again in 2007 in defence of their title, losing 15–6 to South Africa, and reached the final for the fourth time in 2019, once again losing to South Africa, 32–12.

England players traditionally wear a white shirt with a rose embroidered on the chest, white shorts, and navy blue socks with a white trim. England's home ground is Twickenham Stadium where they first played in 1910. The team is administered by the Rugby Football Union (RFU). Four former players have been inducted into the International Rugby Hall of Fame; one of these is also a member of the IRB Hall of Fame. Seven other former players are members of the IRB Hall – four solely for their accomplishments as players, two solely for their achievements in other roles in the sport, and one for achievements both as a player and administrator.

History

Early years 

The expansion of rugby in the first half of the 19th century was driven by former pupils from many of England's public schools, especially Rugby, who, upon finishing school, took the game with them to universities, to London, and to the counties. England's first international match was against Scotland on 27 March 1871; not only was this England's first match, but it is also noted as being the first rugby union international. Scotland won the match by one goal and a try to England's one unconverted try, in front of a crowd of 4,000 people at Raeburn Place, Edinburgh. A subsequent international took place at the Oval in London on 5 February 1872, when England defeated Scotland by a goal, a drop goal and two tries to Scotland's one drop goal. The early matches did not use a structured points system; this would not be introduced until after 1890 when a suitable format for the scoring system had been devised. Up until 1875, international rugby matches were decided by the number of goals scored (conversions and dropped goals), but from 1876 the number of tries scored could be used to decide a match if the teams were level on goals.

In 1875, England played their first game against Ireland at the Oval, winning by one goal, one drop goal and one try to nil; this was Ireland's first test match. England defeated Scotland in 1880 to become the first winners of the Calcutta Cup. Their first match against Wales was played on 19 February 1881 at Richardson's Field in Blackheath, where England recorded their largest victory, winning by seven goals, six tries, and one drop goal to nil, and scoring 13 tries in the process. The subsequent meeting the following year at St. Helen's in Swansea was a closer contest, with England defeating Wales by two goals and four tries to nil. Two years later, England emerged as the inaugural winners at the first Home Nations championship. In 1889, they played their first match against a non-home nations team when they defeated the New Zealand Natives at Rectory Field in Blackheath by one goal and four tries to nil. England shared the Home Nations trophy with Scotland in 1890.

England first played New Zealand (known as the "All Blacks") in 1905 at Crystal Palace in London. New Zealand scored five tries, worth three points at the time, to win 15–0. England played France for the first time in March 1906 in Paris, winning 35–8, and later that year they first faced South Africa (known as the "Springboks"), again at Crystal Palace. James Peters was withdrawn from the England squad when the South Africans refused to play against a black player; the match was drawn 3–3. England first played Australia (known as the "Wallabies") in January 1909 at Blackheath's Rectory Field, where they were defeated 9–3.

 
The year 1909 saw the opening of Twickenham Stadium as the RFU's new home, heralding a golden era for English rugby union. England's first international at Twickenham in 1910 brought them victory over Wales on their way to winning the International Championship (known from then as the Five Nations) for the first time since 1892. Although England did not retain the Five Nations title in 1911, they did share it (with Ireland) in 1912. England then achieved their first Five Nations Grand Slam in 1913, another in 1914, and a third in 1921 after the First World War. A further two consecutive Grand Slams followed for the England team in 1924 and 1925, this despite having started 1925 with an 17–11 loss to the "Invincibles" in front of 60,000 fans at Twickenham.

After winning a sixth Grand Slam in 1928, England were subjected to a 7–0 defeat by the Springboks in front of 70,000 spectators at Twickenham in January 1932. Following the expulsion of France from the International Championship in 1931 due to professionalism, which reverted the Five Nations tournament back to the Home Nations, England proceeded to win the 1934 and 1937 championships with a Triple Crown, and achieved their first victory over the All Blacks at Twickenham in January 1936.

When the Five Nations resumed with the readmission of France in 1947 after the Second World War, England shared the championship with Wales. The early Five Nations competitions of the 1950s were unsuccessful for England, winning one match in the 1950 and 1951 championships. England won the 1953 Five Nations, and followed this up with a Grand Slam in 1957, and win in 1958. England broke France's four-championship streak by winning the 1963 Championship. After this victory, England played three Tests in the Southern Hemisphere and lost all three: 21–11 and 9–6 against the All Blacks, and 18–9 against Australia. England did not win a single match in 1966, and managed only a draw with Ireland. They did not win another Championship that decade.

Don White was appointed as England's first coach in 1969. According to former Northampton player Bob Taylor, "Don was chosen because he was the most forward-thinking coach in England". His first match in charge was an 11–8 victory over South Africa at Twickenham in 1969. Of the eleven games England played with White in charge they won three, and drew one and lost seven. He resigned as England coach in 1971.

England had wins against Southern Hemisphere teams in the 1970s; with victories over South Africa in 1972, New Zealand in 1973 and Australia in 1973 and 1976. The 1972 Five Nations Championship was not completed due to the Troubles in Northern Ireland when Scotland and Wales refused to play their Five Nations away fixtures in Ireland. England played in Dublin in 1973 and were given a standing ovation lasting five minutes. After losing 18–9 at Lansdowne Road, the England captain, John Pullin famously stated, "We might not be very good but at least we turned up."

England started the following decade with a Grand Slam victory in the 1980 Five Nations – their first for 23 years. However in the 1983 Five Nations Championship, England failed to win a game and picked up the wooden spoon. In the first Rugby World Cup in New Zealand and Australia, England were grouped in pool A alongside Australia, Japan and the United States. England lost their first game 19–6 against Australia. They went on to defeat Japan and the United States, and met Wales in their quarter-final, losing the match 16–3.

In 1989, England won matches against Romania and Fiji, followed by victories in their first three Five Nations games of 1990. They lost to Scotland in their last game however, giving Scotland a Grand Slam. England recovered in the following year by winning their first Grand Slam since 1980. England hosted the 1991 World Cup and were in pool A, along with the All Blacks, Italy and the United States. Although they lost to the All Blacks in pool play, they qualified for a quarter-final going on to defeat France 19–10. England then defeated Scotland 9–6 to secure a place in the final against Australia which they lost 12–6.

The next year, England completed another Grand Slam and did not lose that year, including a victory over the Springboks. In the lead up to the 1995 World Cup in South Africa, England completed another Grand Slam – their third in five years. In the World Cup, England defeated Argentina, Italy and Samoa in pool play and then defeated Australia 25–22 in their quarter-final. England's semi-final was dominated by the All Blacks and featured four tries, now worth five points each, by Jonah Lomu; England lost 45–29. They then lost the third-place play-off match against France.

Professional era 
England won their 20th Triple Crown title in 1997, but came second in the championship after a narrow 23–20 defeat against France at Twickenham. Sir Clive Woodward replaced Jack Rowell as the England head coach later that year. On 6 December 1997, England drew 26–26 with New Zealand at Twickenham, after being heavily defeated (29–11) by South Africa at the same venue the week before and by New Zealand (25–8) in Manchester two weeks previously. In 1998, England toured Australia, New Zealand and South Africa; many of the experienced players were unavailable for what was to become nicknamed the "Tour from Hell" during which England lost all of their matches including a punishing 76–0 defeat by the Wallabies. In the last Five Nations match on 11 April 1999, with England poised to win the championship, Welsh centre Scott Gibbs sliced through six English tackles to score a try in the last minute, and the ensuing conversion by Neil Jenkins handed the final Five Nations title to Scotland.

England commenced the new millennium by winning the inaugural Six Nations Championship, although they lost their last match to Scotland. They successfully defended their title the following year, but missed out on the Grand Slam by losing 20–14 to Ireland in a postponed match at Lansdowne Road. Although France won the 2002 Six Nations Championship, England defeated the other Home Nations teams to win the Triple Crown. In 2002, England beat Argentina 26–18 in Buenos Aires, and in the Autumn internationals they defeated New Zealand 31–28, Australia 32–31, and South Africa 53–3 at Twickenham. At the 2003 Six Nations Championship, England won the Grand Slam for the first time since 1995, followed by wins over Australia and the All Blacks on their June summer tour.

Going into the 2003 World Cup as one of the tournament favourites, England reached the final on 22 November 2003 against host Australia. The game went into extra time with the score tied at 14–14; after one penalty apiece and with just seconds to spare, a match-winning drop goal by fly-half Jonny Wilkinson brought the final score to 20–17, making England rugby world champions for the first time. Not only was this England's first Rugby World Cup victory, but it was the nation's first world cup since the England national football team won the 1966 FIFA World Cup. On 8 December, the England team were greeted by 750,000 supporters on a victory parade through London before meeting Queen Elizabeth II at Buckingham Palace.

England finished third in the 2004 Six Nations Championship after losing their matches to both France and Ireland. Clive Woodward resigned as head coach on 2 September and Andy Robinson was appointed to replace him. Robinson's first Six Nations campaign in 2005 resulted in fourth place for England, and although they defeated Australia 26–16 at Twickenham in the Autumn internationals, this was followed by a 23–19 loss to the All Blacks.

A 25–14 loss to South Africa in the 2006 Autumn internationals was England's eighth defeat in nine test matches, their worst losing streak. Andy Robinson resigned as head coach after this run, and attack coach Brian Ashton was appointed as his replacement in December. England started the 2007 Six Nations Championship with a Calcutta Cup victory over Scotland. That year's championship included a historic match at Croke Park which England lost 43–13, their heaviest defeat against Ireland.

At the 2007 World Cup, England were grouped in Pool A with Samoa, Tonga, South Africa, and the United States. They progressed to the knockout stage despite a heavy 36–0 loss to South Africa, and narrowly defeated Australia 12–10 in the quarter-finals. England then faced hosts France in the semi-finals and triumphed 14–9 to qualify for the final, where they were subjected to a second defeat by the Springboks at this World Cup, losing the match 15–6. England followed up their World Cup disappointment with two consecutive second-place finishes in the Six Nations Championship, behind Wales (2008) and Ireland (2009). Former England team captain Martin Johnson took up the job of head coach in July 2008 but, unable to replicate his on-field success in the management role, he resigned in November 2011 following a miserable Rugby World Cup which featured a series of on- and off-field controversies and ended in quarter-final defeat by France.

In March 2012, the Rugby Football Union appointed Stuart Lancaster, the former Elite Rugby Director at Leeds Carnegie, as England's head coach. He had previously been employed in the position on a short-term basis, assisted by existing forwards coach Graham Rowntree, and Andy Farrell. Lancaster was considered a success in his first campaign as head coach: defending champions England took second place in the 2012 Six Nations Championship after losing 19–12 to Wales at Twickenham, but successfully defended the Calcutta Cup by defeating Scotland 13–6 at Murrayfield. England finished the year on a high when they beat World Cup holders New Zealand 38–21 at Twickenham in the Autumn internationals; the England team dominated the match and completely outplayed the All Blacks, who had been unbeaten in 20 matches.

At the 2013 Six Nations Championship, England again finished in second place behind Wales, and were deprived of the opportunity to win the Grand Slam for the first time since 2003 when defeated by Wales in Cardiff 30–3. It was the first time since 1974 that every team in the Six Nations managed to win at least three competition points (the equivalent of a win and a draw, or three draws). However, England retained the Calcutta Cup by defeating Scotland 38–18 at Twickenham. Lancaster took an experimental side on a summer tour of Argentina in 2013; after beating a South American select XV on 2 June, England achieved a 2–0 series victory over Argentina, their first away series win against the Pumas for 32 years.

In 2015, England hosted the Rugby World Cup, but were eliminated in the pool stage. Despite this setback, and following the appointment of new head coach Eddie Jones, England won the Grand Slam in the 2016 Six Nations Championship, and remained unbeaten for the whole of 2016, including a series whitewash of Australia in Sydney. They went on to equal the world record of 18 consecutive test wins with an impressive 61–21 victory over Scotland in securing the 2017 Six Nations Championship.

2018 began well for England, seeing off a spirited challenge from Italy 46–15, and winning a tight contest against Wales 12–6 in the first two rounds of the Six Nations. However, it wasn't until June before England recorded another win, as the team lost their remaining games against Scotland (25–13), France (22–16) and eventual Grand Slam winners Ireland (24–15) at home at Twickenham. A non-test loss against the Barbarians (63–45) followed.

On their summer tour of South Africa, England lost the first two matches 42–39 and 23–12, after leading both early in the first half, before winning the third test 25–10 against a mostly second-string Springbok side. That autumn, after adding former New Zealand and United States coach John Mitchell to the coaching setup, England won the return match against South Africa by a single point at 12–11, and lost an equally close contest with New Zealand 16–15, both in controversial circumstances. England rounded out the year with wins over Japan (35–15) and Australia (37–18). The win over Australia continued an unbroken run of victories over the Wallabies under former Australia coach Eddie Jones.

England finished second in the 2019 Six Nations Championship having lost to Wales in Cardiff and drawn 38-38 with Scotland at Twickenham after leading 31-0. In the 2019 Rugby World Cup warm-up matches they defeated Wales 33-19 at Twickenham before losing 13-6 in Cardiff. They then recorded their largest win over Ireland with a 57-15 victory at Twickenham before defeating Italy 37-0 at St James' Park. In the 2019 Rugby World Cup, England became the first team to qualify for the quarter-finals following a 39-10 win over Argentina in Chōfu. After their final match was cancelled due to Typhoon Hagibis, England topped Pool C and faced Australia in the quarter-finals. England won the quarter-final 40-16, recording a seventh successive victory over Australia in the Wallabies' largest-ever Rugby World Cup defeat. England then defeated New Zealand in the semi-final, equalling their largest Rugby World Cup defeat with a 19-7 victory in which the All Blacks were kept scoreless for 57 minutes. On 2 November 2019, England were defeated 12-32 by South Africa in the 2019 Rugby World Cup Final.

In the 2020 Six Nations Championship, England were defeated 24-17 in their opening game against France in Paris before recording victories against Scotland at Murrayfield and Ireland and Wales at Twickenham. The tournament was then halted due to the COVID-19 pandemic and resumed with the matches played in empty stadia in October. In the postponed matches, England recorded a bonus point win over Italy in Rome before France's defeat of Ireland by eight points meant that England won the championship on points difference. Due to the pandemic, the scheduled 2020 Autumn Internationals were replaced by the Autumn Nations Cup. England defeated Georgia, Wales and Ireland before facing France in the final match, winning 22-19 after extra time at Twickenham to secure the tournament.

England finished fifth in the 2021 Six Nations Championship, beating France and Italy but losing to all three home nations for the first time since 1976 and conceding defeat to Scotland at Twickenham for the first time since 1983. In the 2021 autumn internationals England played three matches at Twickenham. They secured a 69-3 victory over Tonga, recorded their eighth successive victory against Australia and defeated world champions South Africa 27-26.

England finished third in the 2022 Six Nations Championship after defeating Italy and Wales but losing to Ireland, France and Scotland.

Home stadium 

Twickenham is the largest dedicated rugby stadium in the world. In the early years, the English rugby team used a number of venues in several different locations around England before settling at Twickenham Stadium in 1910. After sell-out matches at Crystal Palace against New Zealand in 1905 and South Africa in 1906, the Rugby Football Union (RFU) decided to invest in their own ground and arranged for sportsman and entrepreneur Billy Williams to find a home ground for English Rugby. The land for the ground was purchased in 1907 for £5,572 12s and 6d, and construction began the following year.

The first international match at Twickenham took place on 15 January 1910 between England and Wales. The home team ran out winners 11–6, beating Wales for the first time since 1898. The stadium was expanded in 1927 and again in 1932, but there were no further upgrades until 1981 when a new South stand was built and the 1990s when new North, East and West stands were built; the South stand was replaced in 2005 and 2006 to make the stadium into a complete bowl. England played their first test match at the redeveloped Twickenham on 5 November 2006 against the All Blacks, who won the match 41–20, dominating the England team in front of a record crowd of 82,076.

The pitch at Twickenham was replaced in June 2012 with a hybrid 'Desso' type, which uses artificial fibres entwined with real grass. This type of pitch surface is particularly hard wearing in wet conditions.

England home matches outside Twickenham 
Although England have played home matches almost exclusively at Twickenham since 1910, they have occasionally used alternative English venues. England home matches have been hosted at Leicester's Welford Road (1923), London's Wembley Stadium (1992), Manchester's Old Trafford (1997 and 2009), Huddersfield's McAlpine Stadium (twice in 1998), Manchester's Etihad Stadium (2015), and St James' Park in Newcastle upon Tyne (2019).

The first of a two-test series, this match was originally scheduled to be held in Argentina but moved by the Argentine Rugby Union for financial reasons.
This was a Pool A match at the 2015 Rugby World Cup.

England also played a Five Nations match against Wales at Wembley Stadium on 11 April 1999. Wales was the "home team" on this occasion because Wembley was being used as a temporary base while their new stadium in Cardiff was being constructed. Wales won the match 32–31.

"Swing Low, Sweet Chariot" 

"Swing Low, Sweet Chariot" is commonly sung at England fixtures – especially at Twickenham. In the last match of the 1988 season, against Ireland, three of England's tries were scored by Chris Oti. A group of boys from the Benedictine school Douai, following a tradition at their school games, sang the song on his final try, and other spectators around the ground joined in. Since then "Swing Low, Sweet Chariot" became a song to sing at England home games. In 1991, the RFU marketing director Mike Coley for the team to launch a song leading up to that year's Rugby World Cup. He had wanted to use "Jerusalem", but it was used in the Rugby League Challenge Cup final that year, so the song was changed at short notice to "Swing Low". There were a number of versions recorded and the version released did reach the top 40 in the UK Singles Chart during the competition.

Strip 

England rugby union players typically wear all-white jerseys and white shorts, with predominantly navy blue socks. The emblem on the jerseys is a red rose. As of 1 September 2020, the strip is manufactured by Umbro and the shirt sponsor is O2. The away strip is usually red or dark grey (described as "anthracite"); prior to the introduction of the grey strip, red was the traditional change colour. Navy blue has also been used in the past and was reintroduced for the 2016–17 and 2020–21 seasons. Purple was used during the 2009 autumn internationals, reflecting the traditional colour of the original England tracksuits from the 1960s until the 1980s. The away strip was black for the first time during the 2011 Rugby World Cup.

The Rugby Football Union (RFU) had created the national side's emblem prior to an English team being sent to Edinburgh to play a Scottish side. A red rose was chosen to be the side's emblem. The white kit worn by the national team was taken from the kit used at Rugby School. Alfred Wright, an employee of the Rugby Football Union, is credited with the standardisation and new design of the rose, which up until 1920 had undergone many variations in its depiction. The Wright design is thought to have been used without minor alteration until the late 1990s. It was not until 1997 that the rose was modernised, when Nike became the official strip supplier (with the stem section of the rose being green rather than brown as previously).

In 2003, England first used a skin-tight strip. This was intended to make it more difficult for the opposition to grasp the shirt when tackling.

The current England strip for 2020–21 is made by Umbro. It features plain white shorts and a plain white jersey with red seams on the neck and sleeves. The current alternative kit is blue and features the same red seams. Shorts are also blue. Home socks are blue with a white top, alternative socks are plain blue.

Kit providers

Record

Six Nations 
England competes annually in the Six Nations Championship, which is played against five other European nations: France, Ireland, Italy, Scotland, and Wales. The Six Nations started out as the Home Nations Championship in 1883 which England won with a Triple Crown. England have won the title outright 29 times (a record for the tournament) and shared victory ten times. Their longest wait between championships was 18 years (1892–1910). During the Six Nations, England also contests the Calcutta Cup with Scotland (which England first won in 1880) and the Millennium Trophy with Ireland (which England first won in 1988). The matches between England and France are traditionally known as "Le Crunch".

Note: England are the only team to have won more than two successive grand slams, on more than one occasion, doing so in 1913–1914, 1923–1924 and 1991–1992; while Wales and France the only other teams to have done so twice, in 1908–1909 for Wales and 1997–1998 for France.

Rugby World Cup 

England have contested every Rugby World Cup since the tournament began in 1987, reaching the final four times and winning the title in 2003.

In the inaugural tournament, England finished second in their pool before losing to Wales in the quarter-finals. They again finished pool runners-up in 1991 but recovered to beat France in the quarter-finals, and then Scotland in the semi-finals, en route to a 12–6 final defeat to Australia at Twickenham on 2 November 1991.

In 1995, England topped their pool and defeated Australia 25–22 at the quarter-final stage before being beaten by the All Blacks in the semi-final. Their third-place play-off match against France was lost 19–9.

In the 1999 tournament, England again finished second in their pool. Although they proceeded to win a play-off game against Fiji, they went out of the tournament in the quarter-finals, losing 44–21 to South Africa.

England came top of their pool in 2003 and progressed to the final, beating Wales and France in the quarter- and semi-finals. With a drop goal in the last minute of extra time, England won the final 20–17 against Australia in Sydney on 22 November 2003.

England made a poor start to their defence of the World Cup in 2007, with a below par victory over the United States and a heavy 36–0 defeat to South Africa, leaving the title holders on the brink of elimination at the pool stage. Improved performances against Samoa and Tonga ensured that England again reached the knockout stage as pool runners-up, before a surprise 12–10 defeat of Australia in the quarter-finals followed by a narrow 14–9 victory over the host nation carried England to a second successive final appearance. In the final, held in Paris on 20 October, England lost 15–6 to South Africa, their second defeat by the Springboks during the 2007 tournament.

England reached the quarter-final stage in 2011, losing 19–12 to France.

In 2015, England became the first sole host nation to fail to qualify for the knockout stage, after losing to Wales and Australia in the pool stage.

In 2019, England finished top of their pool before defeating Australia and New Zealand in the knockout stage. On 2 November 2019, they suffered a 32–12 final defeat to South Africa in Yokohama, becoming World Cup runners-up for the third time.

England's Jonny Wilkinson is the highest points scorer in the Rugby World Cup, having scored 277 points between 1999 and 2011. England have the fourth most points and the fourth most tries scored in the Rugby World Cup.

Overall 

When the World Rugby Rankings were first introduced in early September 2003, England were ranked 1st; they fell to 2nd for a week in November 2003 before regaining 1st place. They again dropped to 2nd in the rankings, and then to 3rd, from mid-June 2004. Following the 2005 Six Nations Championship, they fell to 6th in the world rankings, where they remained until moving up to 5th place in December of that year. After a decline in form in 2006, England finished the year ranked 7th; however, they bounced back to 3rd in 2007 due to their good run in that year's World Cup, where they finished runners-up.

Their ranking slipped again in 2008 and during the 2009 Six Nations Championship they dropped to their lowest ranking of 8th, where they remained for the duration of the 2009 Autumn internationals. After a brief resurgence that saw them rise to a ranking of 4th in the world, England again slipped following a poor showing at the 2011 Rugby World Cup and were ranked 6th in February 2012. The team entered the 2015 Rugby World Cup ranked 4th, but after failing to progress beyond the pool stage, England again sank to 8th in the world in November 2015. In March 2016, after securing the Grand Slam in the 2016 Six Nations Championship, England rose to second place, where they remained the following year after winning the 2017 Six Nations Championship. A poor fifth-place performance in the 2018 Six Nations Championship saw them fall to sixth place.

In October 2019, England defeated New Zealand in the semi-final of the 2019 Rugby World Cup to top the World Rugby Rankings for the first time since 2004. After losing the final to South Africa, England were ranked third. In November 2020, they regained second place following New Zealand's loss to Argentina.

During the 2021 Six Nations, a fifth place finish saw England fall from second to third after defeats to Scotland, Wales and Ireland. After Australia won 5 matches in a row during the 2021 Rugby Championship, England fell to fourth until defeats of Australia and South Africa in the 2021 Autumn Nations Series saw them regain third place.

During the 2022 Six Nations, England again suffered three defeats to Scotland, Ireland and France and fell from third to fifth.

Players

Current squad 
On 19 December 2022, former England captain and Leicester Tigers head coach Steve Borthwick was appointed as England head coach by the RFU. He replaced Eddie Jones, who was sacked from the role on 6 December 2022.

On 16 January 2023, Borthwick named a 36-player England squad for the 2023 Six Nations Championship.

 Head coach:  Steve Borthwick
 Defence coach:  Kevin Sinfield
 Attack coach:  Nick Evans
 Forwards coach:  Richard Cockerill

Caps and clubs updated to: 18 March 2023

On 29 January 2023, Borthwick named an updated 36-player squad, ahead of the opening fixture against Scotland on 4 February 2023, which added several players to the original squad, following injuries to Elliot Daly, Dan Kelly, Courtney Lawes, George McGuigan and Henry Slade.

On 6 February 2023, Borthwick named a revised 36-player squad for the second round fixture against Italy on 12 February 2023, which included a number of players returning from injury.

On 19 February 2023, Borthwick named an altered 36-player squad for the third round fixture against Wales on 25 February 2023, which recalled several veterans and two uncapped players.

On 28 February 2023, Borthwick named a 26-player training squad for the fallow week ahead of the fourth round fixture against France on 11 March 2023, with a recall for Jonny May.

On 13 March 2023, Borthwick named the final 36-player squad ahead of the last round fixture against Ireland on 18 March 2023, with new call-ups in place of Ollie Chessum and Ollie Lawrence, who withdrew because of injury.

Notable players 

Four former England representatives have been inducted into the International Rugby Hall of Fame: Bill Beaumont, Martin Johnson, Jason Leonard and Wavell Wakefield.

Seven former England internationals are also members of the IRB Hall of Fame. Four of them – Johnson, Alan Rotherham, Harry Vassall and Robert Seddon – were inducted for their accomplishments as players. Two other former England players, John Kendall-Carpenter and Clive Woodward, were inducted into the IRB Hall for non-playing accomplishments in the sport. Another former England player, Alfred St. George Hamersley, was inducted for achievements as both a player and a rugby administrator.

Wavell Wakefield represented England in 31 Tests between 1920 and 1927, including 13 Tests as captain. He was involved in three Five Nations Grand Slams in 1921, 1923 and 1924. Playing as flanker, Wakefield introduced new elements to back row tactics which beforehand concentrated on the set piece. He became a Member of Parliament in 1935, and was knighted in 1944. He became the RFU President in 1950 and following his retirement from politics was awarded the title the first Baron Wakefield of Kendal.

Between 1975 and 1982, Bill Beaumont represented England in 34 Tests. Playing at lock, he was captain between 1978 and 1982 in 21 Tests including the 1980 Grand Slam – England's first since 1957. Later that year, he captained the British Lions to South Africa – the first time an Englishman had captained the Lions since 1930. Furthermore, Beaumont represented the Barbarians FC on fifteen occasions.

At 22 the youngest England captain of modern times was Will Carling who represented England in 72 Tests, and as captain 59 times between 1988 and 1996. He was best known as a superlative leader, motivating England to a remarkable three Grand Slams in five years, including back to back slams in 1991 and 1992. He also led England to the final of the 1991 World Cup, and captained the Barbarians FC. His playing talents were not as flamboyant as some of his colleagues, but his effectiveness cemented him as a first choice at centre. It is possible he would already be in the Hall of Fame were it not for outspoken tendencies with respect to the English RFU committee ("Old Farts"), who may, as a result, be reluctant to acknowledge his achievements. He was made an OBE in 1991. Carling is not, however, the youngest England captain of all time; that honour goes to Frederic Stokes, who captained England against Scotland on 27 March 1871 aged just 20 years and 258 days.

Described as arguably "the greatest forward" to play for England, Martin Johnson played 84 Tests for England, and 8 Tests for the British and Irish Lions. He first represented England in 1993, and later that year the Lions. He captained the Lions to South Africa in 1997, and in 1999 was appointed captain of England. He became England's most successful ever captain. He became the first player to captain two Lions tours when he captained them in Australia in 2001. He retired from Test rugby after he led England to a Six Nations Grand Slam and World Cup victory in 2003 and has since become the team Manager. At the 2011 IRB Awards ceremony in Auckland on 24 October 2011, the night after the World Cup Final, Johnson was inducted into the IRB Hall of Fame alongside all other World Cup-winning captains from 1987 through 2007 (minus the previously inducted Australian John Eales).

Jason Leonard, also known as "The Fun Bus", appeared 114 times for England at prop, which was the world record for international appearances for a national team until 2005, when it was surpassed by Australia scrum-half George Gregan. He was on the England team that finished runners up to Australia in the 1991 Rugby World Cup final, but avenged this 12 years later, coming on as a substitute for Phil Vickery in England's victorious 2003 Rugby World Cup final appearance. He also went on three British and Irish Lions tours where he was capped five times.

Alan Rotherham and Harry Vassall, both 19th-century greats for Oxford and England, were inducted into the IRB Hall in April 2011. The IRB recognised them for "their unique contribution to the way that Rugby was played", specifically stating that they "are credited with pioneering the passing game and the three-man backline, which became widespread during the 1880s".

Two other England internationals, John Kendall-Carpenter and Clive Woodward, were inducted into the IRB Hall alongside Johnson at the 2011 IRB Awards. Although both had notable careers for England, they were recognised for accomplishments in other roles in the sport. Kendall-Carpenter was cited as one of four key figures in the creation of the Rugby World Cup, whilst Woodward was inducted as coach of the 2003 World Cup winners, alongside all other World Cup-winning coaches from 1987 to 2007.

England's most recent inductees into the IRB Hall are 19th-century internationals Alfred St. George Hamersley and Robert Seddon, both inducted in 2013. Hamersley played for England in the first rugby union international against Scotland in 1871, and captained England in the last of his four appearances in 1874. He went on to play significant roles in the early development of the sport in both New Zealand and Canada. Seddon, capped three times for England in 1887, was most notable as the captain of the unofficial British side that toured Australia and New Zealand in 1888; he died in a boating accident during the tour. This venture proved to be the genesis of the modern British and Irish Lions. The touring team was also inducted alongside Seddon.

Individual records 

Ben Youngs holds the record for most appearances for England with 122. Jonny Wilkinson holds the England record for most points with 1,179, placing him second all-time in international rugby. Rory Underwood scored 49 tries - placing him sixth all-time in international rugby.

Training 
Pennyhill Park Hotel in Bagshot, Surrey, is the chosen training base for the team in the 2015 Rugby World Cup. Loughborough University, Bisham Abbey and the University of Bath grounds served as training bases prior to this agreement. Martin Johnson noted the hotel's facilities and its proximity to Twickenham and Heathrow as deciding factors in this decision. The team had their own pitchside gym and fitness rooms constructed on the hotel premises at the start of the long-term arrangement. Since its completion in 2010 the team also regularly use Surrey Sports Park at the University of Surrey in nearby Guildford for much of their training.

Club versus country 

Although the England team is governed by the Rugby Football Union (RFU), players have been contracted to their clubs since the advent of professionalism in late 1995. Since then, players have often been caught in a "power struggle" between their clubs and the RFU; this is commonly referred to as a "club versus country" conflict. The first major dispute between England's top clubs (who play in the English Premiership) and the RFU occurred in 1998, when some of the clubs refused to release players to tour Australia, New Zealand and South Africa. The tour became known as the "Tour from hell" after an England squad of second-string players were defeated in all four Tests, including a 76–0 defeat by Australia. The clubs also withdrew from the 1998–99 Heineken Cup.

In 2001, the top clubs and the RFU formed "England Rugby" to help govern the club and international game. The parties agreed to restrict the number of matches at club and international level that elite players (a group of 50 or 60 players selected by the RFU) could play in order to reduce player burnout and injuries. In return for releasing players from club commitments, the clubs were to receive compensation from the RFU. This agreement was considered central to the England victory in the 2003 World Cup. Clive Woodward, England coach from November 1997, resigned in 2004 because he was unable to get the access to the players that he wanted: "I wanted more from the union – more training days with the players, more influence over the way they were treated – and ended up with less." Andy Robinson, Woodward's successor, blamed the lack of control over players for his team's unsuccessful record. Brian Ashton, who took over from Robinson, intentionally named his playing squad for Six Nations matches in 2007 early in the hope that their clubs would not play them in the weekend prior to a Test. The RFU and the Premiership clubs are negotiating a similar deal to the one in 2001 that will enable international players to be released into the England squad prior to international matches.

Coaches 
The following is a list of all England coaches. The first appointed coach was Don White in 1969. The most recent former coach was Eddie Jones. Jones took over from Stuart Lancaster a week after the latter's resignation, and he became the first foreigner to coach the English national side.

Updated To: 19 March 2023

Rob Andrew coached the team for the 2008 summer tests in New Zealand in Martin Johnson's absence.

Note: Richard Cockerill served briefly as interim head coach, following the dismissal of Eddie Jones, until the appointment of Steve Borthwick. No tests were played during Cockerill's tenure.

Between September 2015 and March 2017, England won 18 test matches in a row – equalling the record for a top tier nation – 17 of which were under Eddie Jones.

Media coverage 
England's autumn internationals are televised live by Prime Video. Highlights of the autumn tests are broadcast by the BBC. As of 2023, all Six Nations games are broadcast free-to-air on the BBC and ITV.

See also 
 England national under-20 rugby union team
 England national rugby sevens team
 England Saxons
 England women's national rugby union team
 Rugby union in England

Bibliography

References

External links 

 

 
Rugby union in England
European national rugby union teams
Laureus World Sports Awards winners
1871 establishments in England